Disappointment Island is one of seven uninhabited islands in the Auckland Islands archipelago, in New Zealand. It is home to a large colony of white-capped albatrosses: about 65,000 pairs – nearly the entire world's population – nest there. Also on the island is the Auckland rail, endemic to the archipelago; once thought to be extinct, it was rediscovered in 1966.

History 
On 7 March 1907, the Dundonald, a steel, four-masted barque, sank after running ashore on the west side of Disappointment Island. Twelve men drowned and sixteen survivors waited seven months for rescue. They survived on supplies from the castaway depot on Auckland Island. The island was visited by a scientific expedition in November 1907.

Etymology 
The etymology of Disappointment Island is unclear; however, the naming of islands that lacked resources—such as the Disappointment Islands—may have been a contributing factor in its naming. Or, indeed, the occurrence of frequent shipwrecks.

Important Bird Area 
The island is part of the Auckland Island group Important Bird Area (IBA), identified as such by BirdLife International because of the significance of the group as a breeding site for several species of seabirds as well as the endemic Auckland shag, Auckland teal, Auckland rail, and Auckland snipe.

See also 

 Composite Antarctic Gazetteer
 Scientific Committee on Antarctic Research
 New Zealand subantarctic islands
 List of Antarctic and subantarctic islands
 List of islands of New Zealand
 List of islands
 Desert island

References 

Islands of the Auckland Islands
Important Bird Areas of the Auckland Islands
Uninhabited islands of New Zealand